Droniowice  is a village in the administrative district of Gmina Kochanowice, within Lubliniec County, Silesian Voivodeship, in southern Poland.

The village has a population of 384.

References

Droniowice